The Moscow Canal, named the Moskva–Volga Canal until 1947, is a canal in Russia that connects the Moskva River with the Volga River. It is located in Moscow itself and in the Moscow Oblast. The canal connects to the Moskva River in Tushino (an area in the north-west of Moscow), from which it runs approximately north to meet the Volga River in the town of Dubna, just upstream of the dam of the Ivankovo Reservoir.

It was constructed between 1932 and 1937 by 200,000 gulag prisoners, under direction of the Soviet secret police and Matvei Berman.

With the canal, Moscow is connected to Russia's Unified Deep Water System, a large system of canals and rivers in European Russia, which created access to five seas: the White Sea, Baltic Sea, Caspian Sea, Sea of Azov, and the Black Sea. As such, it is sometimes called the "port of the five seas". Apart from transportation, the canal also provides for about half of Moscow's water consumption, and the shores of its numerous reservoirs are used as recreation zones.

The accompanying statue of Joseph Stalin of similar size was demolished in 1961 during the period of de-stalinization.

World War II
During World War II and the Battle of Moscow, the canal played an instrumental role in the defense of Moscow. Wehrmacht plans were to encircle the city from the north and south. To avoid this, water was pumped from the canal and reservoirs, which stopped their advance in this direction.

Dimensions

Gallery

References

Canals in Russia
Economy of Moscow
Geography of Moscow
Canals opened in 1937
CMoscow
Cultural heritage monuments in Moscow